170 Hz is a Dutch film about the love of two deaf teenagers. Although some dialogues are in Dutch, most of it is in Dutch Sign Language and subtitled. The film was first presented on the Dutch Film Festival in September 2011, and was released theatrically on 1 March 2012. The title refers to the frequency of 170 Hertz, the highest frequency which still can be heard by main character Nick (e.g. the sound of a motor bike).

Prizes
The film has won the Audience Award at the Gouden Kalf Awards 2011. Furthermore, the film was nominated for the "Best Sound Award" and Gaite Jansen for "best actress" at these awards.

Cast
 Gaite Jansen as Evy
 Michael Muller as Nick

References

External links 
 
 

Dutch drama films
2011 films
2010s Dutch-language films
Sign-language films
2011 drama films